Loyola lacrosse can refer to:

Loyola Greyhounds men's lacrosse
Loyola Greyhounds women's lacrosse